Haworthia nortieri is a species of succulent plant belonging to the genus Haworthia and is classified under the family Asphodelaceae. It is native to Southern Africa, southwest of Northern Cape.

Description 
.H. nortieri has ovate-lanceolate to obovate leaves, which are green with occasional tinges of purple. Flowers are whitish gray and usually have a yellow center.

References 

Haworthia